Vladimir Ivanovich Pyankov (31 March 1954 – 1 February 2002) was a Russian phytophysiologist, professor of the Ural State University.

Great contribution in studies of structural and functional methods of the ecological studies of photosynthesis has been made by V. I. Pyankov. He successfully developed the idea of academician Adolf Mokronosov about the unity of structure and function in the evolution of photosynthesis.

Named for
 Pyankovia Akhani & E.H.Roalson

Works
 V.I.Pyankov, H.Ziegler, A.Kuz’min, G.E.Edwards. - Origin and evolution of C4 photosynthesis in the tribe Salsoleae (Chenopodiaceae) based on anatomical and biochemical types in leaves and cotyledons. Plant Syst Evol 230: S.43–74, 2001.

References
 Voronin P. Yu., Ivanov L. A., Ivanova L. A., Black C. C. and Ziegler H. (2003) Vladimir Ivanovich P'yankov: Phytophysiologist, Teacher, and Organizer of Science (1954–2002). Russian Journal of Plant Physiology 50(1): 140—146.

Russian biologists
1954 births
2002 deaths
People from Pervouralsk
Ural State University alumni
Academic staff of Ural State University
20th-century biologists